Orgia Pravednikov is a Russian rock group formed in 1999. The peculiar sound of the band arises from the combination of acoustic (flute and acoustic guitar) and electric (drums, electric guitar and bass guitar) sessions.

History
Orgia Pravednikov was formed in early 1999 by a merge of the rock group Artel, whose style can be described as art-rock, and singer-songwriter and acoustic guitarist Sergey Kalugin, who had just had his previous act Dikaya Okhota ('Wild Hunt') disbanded.

According to the members of the band, the name Orgia Pravednikov was prompted by the audience asking what the band should be called during one of concerts.

Soon after the forming the band released an eponymous single, and in 2001 an album Oglaschennye, isydite!. The band, with its unusual sound combining art-rock flute and Kalugin's acoustic guitar arpeggios, on one part, and a hard electric framework on the other, started gaining popularity among the Russian rock audience.

Over the decade, 2001-2010, the band output four studio albums and as many live ones.

The start of the second decade was marked by the band airing on the major national pop-rock radio Nashe Radio. In 2013, Orgia Pravednikov made it to the shortlist of the radio's annual awards, including a song, an album and the vocalist (Kalugin) in respective nominations, though eventually the band did not win any award, as determined by audience poll results.

Also in 2013, the band for the first time took part in the biggest Russian open-air rock-festival Nashestvie.

Members
 Sergey Kalugin — lyrics, acoustic guitar, vocals
 Alexei Burkov — lead guitar
 Yuri Ruslanov — flutes, keyboard
 Artemiy Bondarenko — bass
 Alexander Vetkhov — drums

Discography

Studio albums
 2001 — Oglaschennie, isydite! ( (Catechumen, depart!)).
 2005 — Dveri! Dveri! ( (The doors! The doors!)).
 2007 — Uhodiashee solntse ( (The Fading Sun)).
 2010 — Dlya teh, kto vidit sny ( (For those who dream)).
 2012 — Shitrock. 
 2016 — Dlya teh, kto vidit sny. Vol. 2 ( (For those who dream. Vol. 2)).

Live albums
 2004 — Korablik, CD (translated as Shiplet)
 2006 — Brat' zhiv'em, DVD (translated as Take Alive)
 2008 — Solntsestoyanie, double DVD (translated as Solstice)
 2010 — 10 let OP, DVD (translated as 10 years of OP)
 2014 — Vperyod i vverkh, DVD and double CD (translated as Forward and upward)
 2018 — #juststudio, DVD and CD

Singles
 2000 — "Orgia Pravednikov" (translated as "Orgy of The Righteous")
 2003 — "Poslednii Voin Mertvoi Zemli" (translated as "The Last Warrior of the Dead Land")
 2009 — "Nasha Rodina - SSSR" (translated as "Our Motherland - USSR")
 2013 — "Russkii Extrim"  (translated as "Russian Extreme")
 2014 — "Vdal' po sinei vode"  (translated as "Far on blue water")
 2014 — "S.M.S."  (translated as "The Station of Dead Hearts")
 2020 — "Vremya Budit' Korolei" (translated as "Time to Wake Up Kings")

References

External links
 Official site
 Orgia Pravednikov on iTunes
 

Musical groups from Moscow
Musical groups established in 1999
Russian progressive rock groups
Symphonic metal musical groups
Russian progressive metal musical groups
1999 establishments in Russia